Qilihe District  is one of 5 districts of the prefecture-level city of Lanzhou, the capital of Gansu Province, Northwest China. It is one of 17 administrative districts of Gansu.

Geography 
Qilihe District is located entirely on the southern bank of the Yellow River, and includes part of Lanzhou's main urban area, being the second most populous district of Lanzhou. In the east, it borders on Chengguan District (which includes the downtown Lanzhou), and in the west, on Xigu District. The district also includes some sparsely populated arid highlands south of the river, stretching for several tens of kilometers up to the border of the Dingxi prefecture-level city.

History 
The area of Qilihe district has been inhabited since the Neolithic era. In 1083, a fort was built at present A'gan Town. In the 1940 it was part of Gaolan County, and two towns were located at the present urban centre, Huaqiao (握桥镇) in the east and  Bingping (丙屏镇) in the west. In 1949, these two towns became the eighth and ninth districts of Lanzhou, which were renamed fourth and eighth district respectively in 1953. In 1955, the fourth district became Qilihe District. The name of the district is derived from a stream (hé), located seven (qī) li from downtown Lanzhou, and between the two former towns.

Demographics 
In 2018, the district had a population of 635,000, of which about 100,000 minority population (Hui, Dongxiang, Uyghur, Mongolian, and Tibetan). Most of the minority population of Lanzhou is concentrated in Qilihe.

Transport

Lanzhou's biggest railway station, Lanzhou West railway station is located in Qilihe district. G212 starts in Qilihe and G109 passes through Qilihe, G75 Lanzhou–Haikou Expressway begins in Qilihe District. Long-distance buses depart from Lanzhou West Bus Station. Metro line 1 and line 2 (under construction) pass through the core of Qilihe.

Tourism
The district's sights include the waterfront Xihu Park, with a good view of the Yellow River and the well-known "Mother River" statue, symbolizing the role of the Yellow River for Chinese civilization. The monument is considered the symbol of Lanzhou. Gansu Provincial Museum is near the centre of Qilihe district. An amusement park is located in the northwest of Qilihe. Lanzhou's sole aquarium and Lanzhou Workers' Palace of Culture are also located in the district.

Economy 

The local economy mainly depended on state-owned enterprises, but service industry and commerce has become of greater importance.

Education

Both of Lanzhou University of Technology's campuses are in Qilihe District

Healthcare
 Lanzhou General Military Hospital
 Gansu Chinese Medicine Hospital
 Lanshi Hospital
 First People's Hospital of Lanzhou

Administrative divisions
The district administers 9 subdistricts, 5 towns, 1 township, 59 administrative villages and 78 residential communities.
Subdistricts
 Xiyuan Subdistrict
 Xihu  Subdistrict
 Jianlan Road Subdistrict()
 Dunhuang Road Subdistrict
 Xizhan Subdistrict
 Yanjiaping Subdistrict
 Gongjiawan Subdistrict
 Tumendun Subdistrict
 Xiuchuan Subdistrict
Towns
 A'gan Town
 Xiguoyuan Town
 Bali Town
 Pengjiaping Town
 Huangyu Town -it is upgraded from Township.
Townships
 Weiling Township

References

See also

 List of administrative divisions of Gansu

Geography of Lanzhou
County-level divisions of Gansu